Talchako Mountain is one of the principal summits of the Pacific Ranges subdivision of the Coast Mountains in southern British Columbia.  It stands west of the Talchako River, and north of the Monarch Icefield. The mountain is situated 5.5 km (3.4 mi) south of Horribilis Peak, and 33 km (20 mi) south of Stuie.

The north face is composed of steep rock and snow with a glacier and the south portion of the mountain is composed of rock gullies and snow. The east face has an impressive relief of 1000 or more meters of technical terrain.

Climate
Based on the Köppen climate classification, Talchako Mountain is located in the marine west coast climate zone of western North America. Most weather fronts originate in the Pacific Ocean, and travel east toward the Coast Mountains where they are forced upward by the range (Orographic lift), causing them to drop their moisture in the form of rain or snowfall. As a result, the Coast Mountains experience high precipitation, especially during the winter months in the form of snowfall. Temperatures can drop below −20 °C with wind chill factors below −30 °C.

See also
Geography of British Columbia

References 

Three-thousanders of British Columbia
Pacific Ranges
Range 3 Coast Land District